Zornitsa is a village in Aksakovo Municipality, in Varna Province, Bulgaria.

References

Villages in Varna Province